In Western anthropology, philosophy, and literature, the noble savage is a stock character who is uncorrupted by civilization. As such, the noble savage symbolizes the innate goodness and moral superiority of a primitive people living in harmony with Nature. In the heroic drama of the stageplay The Conquest of Granada by the Spaniards (1672), John Dryden represents the noble savage as an archetype of Man-as-Creature-of-Nature.

The intellectual politics of the Stuart Restoration (1660–1688), expanded Dryden’s playwright usage of savage to denote a human wild beast and a wild man. Concerning civility and incivility, in the Inquiry Concerning Virtue, or Merit (1699), the philosopher Anthony Ashley-Cooper, 3rd Earl of Shaftesbury, said that men and women possess an innate Morality, a sense of right and wrong conduct, which is based upon the intellect and the emotions, and not based upon religious doctrine.

In the philosophic debates of 17th-century Britain, the Inquiry Concerning Virtue, or Merit was the Earl of Shaftesbury’s Ethical response to the political philosophy of Leviathan (1651), in which Thomas Hobbes defended absolute monarchy and justified centralized government as necessary because the condition of Man in the apolitical state of nature is a “war of all against all”, for which reason the lives of men and women are “solitary, poor, nasty, brutish, and short” without the political organization of people and resources. The European Hobbes gave as example the American Indians as people living in the bellicose state of nature that precedes tribes and clans organizing into the societies that compose a civilization.

In 18th-century anthropology the term noble savage then denoted nature's gentleman, an ideal man born from the sentimentalism of moral sense theory. In the 19th century, in the essay "The Noble Savage" (1853) Charles Dickens rendered the noble savage into a rhetorical oxymoron by satirizing the British romanticisation of Primitivism in philosophy and in the arts made possible by moral sentimentalism.

Origins

 16th century
The stock character of the noble savage originated from the essay “Of Cannibals” (1580), about the Tupinambá people of Brazil, wherein the philosopher Michel de Montaigne presents “Nature’s Gentleman”, the bon sauvage counterpart to civilized Europeans in the 16th century.

 17th century
The first usage of the term noble savage in English literature occurs in John Dryden’s stageplay The Conquest of Granada by the Spaniards (1672), about the troubled love of the hero Almanzor and the Moorish beauty Almahide, in which the protagonist defends his life as a free man by denying a prince’s right to put him to death, because he is not a royal subject of the prince:

Dryden likely learned the term noble savage from the History of New France (Histoire de la Nouvelle-France, 1609), by the explorer Marc Lescarbot, about his expedition to the colony of Acadia (1606–1607) in French North America, which contains a chapter titled “The Savages are Truly Noble” that discusses the apolitical freedom of the American Indians to hunt game, unlike in monarchic Europe where hunting is a right exclusive to the aristocracy.

As an explorer of lands unknown to European white men, the Frenchman Lescarbot had a positive perception of the native Indian cultures of North America, unlike the English negative cultural preconceptions about the savage who is not English, based upon expansionist conflicts with the Irish pastoralists, the English isolation from Europe, and the English cultural denigration of their Continental neighbours.

 18th-century
By the 18th century, Montaigne’s predecessor to the noble savage, nature’s gentleman was a stock character usual to the sentimental literature of the time, for which a type of non-European Other became a background character for European stories about adventurous Europeans in the strange lands beyond continental Europe. For the novels, the opera, and the stageplays, the stock of characters included the “Virtuous Milkmaid” and the “Servant-More-Clever-than-The-Master” (e.g. Sancho Panza and Figaro), literary characters who personify the moral superiority of working-class people in the fictional world of the story.

In English literature, British North America was the geographic locus classicus for adventure and exploration stories about European encounters with the noble savage natives, such as the historical novel The Last of the Mohicans: A Narrative of 1757 (1826), by James Fenimore Cooper, and the epic poem The Song of Hiawatha (1855), by Henry Wadsworth Longfellow, both literary works presented the primitivism (geographic, cultural, political) of North America as an ideal place for European Man to commune with Nature, far from the artifice of civilisation; yet in the poem “An Essay on Man” (1734), the Englishman Alexander Pope portrays the American Indian thus:

To the English intellectual Pope, the American Indian was an abstract being unlike his insular European self; thus, from the Western perspective of “An Essay on Man”, Pope’s metaphoric usage of poor means “uneducated and a heathen”, but also denotes a savage who is happy with his rustic life in harmony with Nature, and who believes in deism, a form of natural religion — the idealization and devaluation of the non-European Other derived from the mirror logic of the Enlightenment belief that “men, everywhere and in all times, are the same.”

 19th century
Like Dryden's noble savage term, Pope's phrase “Lo, the Poor Indian!” was used to dehumanize the natives of North America for European purpose, and so justified white settlers’ conflicts with the local Indians for possession of the land. In the mid 19th century, the journalist-editor Horace Greeley published the essay “Lo! The Poor Indian!” (1859) about the social condition of the American Indian in the modern United States:

Moreover, during the American Indian Wars (1609–1924) for possession of the land, European white settlers considered the Indians “an inferior breed of men” and mocked them by using the terms “Lo” and “Mr. Lo” as disrespectful forms of address. In the Western U.S., those terms of address also referred to East Coast humanitarians whose noble-savage conception of the American Indian was unlike the warrior who confronted and fought the frontiersman. Concerning the story of the settler Thomas Alderdice, whose wife was captured and killed by Cheyenne Indians, The Leavenworth, Kansas, Times and Conservative newspaper said: “We wish some philanthropists, who talk about civilizing the Indians, could have heard this unfortunate and almost broken-hearted man tell his story. We think [that the philanthropists] would at least have wavered a little in their [high] opinion of the Lo family.”

Cultural stereotype

The Roman Empire
In Western literature, the Roman book De origine et situ Germanorum (On the Origin and Situation of the Germans, AD 98), by the historian Publius Cornelius Tacitus, introduced the anthropologic concept of the noble savage to the Western World; later a cultural stereotype who featured in the exotic-place tourism reported in the European travel literature of the 17th and the 18th centuries.

Al-Andalus
In the 12th-century Andalusian novel The Living Son of the Vigilant (Ḥayy ibn Yaqẓān, 1160), by the polymath Ibn Tufail, which explores the subject of natural theology as a means to understand the material world. The protagonist is a wild man isolated from his society, whose trials and tribulations lead him to knowledge of Allah by living a rustic life in harmony with Mother Nature.

Kingdom of Spain
In the 15th century, soon after arriving to the Americas in 1492, the Europeans employed the term savage to dehumanise the indigènes (noble-savage natives) of the newly discovered "New World" as ideological justification for the European colonization of the Americas, called the Age of Discovery (1492–1800); thus with the dehumanizing stereotypes of the noble savage and the indigène, the savage and the wild man the Europeans granted themselves the right to colonize the natives inhabiting the islands and the continental lands of the northern, the central, and the southern Americas.

The conquistador mistreatment of the indigenous peoples of the Viceroyalty of New Spain (1521–1821) eventually produced bad-conscience recriminations amongst the European intelligentias for and against colonialism. As the Roman Catholic Bishop of Chiapas, the priest Bartolomé de las Casas witnessed the enslavement of the indigènes of New Spain, yet idealized them into morally innocent noble savages living a simple life in harmony with Mother Nature. At the Valladolid debate (1550–1551) of the moral philosophy of enslaving the native peoples of the Spanish colonies, Bishop de las Casas reported the noble-savage culture of the natives, especially noting their plain-manner social etiquette and that they did not have the social custom of telling lies.

Kingdom of France
In the intellectual debates of the late-16th and the 17th centuries, philosophers used the racist stereotypes of the savage and  the good savage as moral reproaches of the European monarchies fighting the Thirty Years' War (1618–1648) and the French Wars of Religion (1652–1598). In the essay "Of Cannibals" (1580), Michel de Montaigne reported that the Tupinambá people of Brazil ceremoniously eat the bodies of their dead enemies, as a matter of honour, whilst reminding the European reader that such wild man behavior was analogous to the religious barbarism of burning at the stake: "One calls ‘barbarism’ whatever he is not accustomed to." The academic Terence Cave further explains Montaigne's point of moral philosophy:

As philosophic reportage, "Of Cannibals" applies cultural relativism to compare the civilized European to the uncivilized noble savage. Montaigne's anthropological report about cannibalism in Brazil indicated that the Tupinambá people were neither a noble nor an exceptionally good folk, yet neither were the Tupinambá culturally or morally inferior to his contemporary, 16th-century European civilization. From the perspective of Classical liberalism of Montaigne's humanist portrayal of the customs of honor of the Tupinambá people indicates Western philosophic recognition that people are people, despite their different customs, traditions, and codes of honor. The academic David El Kenz explicates the Montaigne's background concerning the violence of customary morality:

Literature

The themes about the person and persona of the noble savage are the subjects of the novel Oroonoko: Or the Royal Slave (1688), by Aphra Behn, which is the tragic love story between Oroonoko, an African prince, and the beautiful Imoinda, a European woman. At Coramantien, Ghana, the protagonist is deceived and delivered into the Atlantic slave trade (16th–19th centuries), and Oroonoku becomes a slave of plantation colonists in Surinam (Dutch Guiana, 1667–1954). In the course of his enslavement, Oroonoko meets the woman who narrates to the reader the life and love of Prince Oroonoko, his enslavement, his leading a slave rebellion against the Dutch planters of Surinam, and his consequent execution by the Dutch colonialists.

Despite Behn having written the popular novel for money, Oroonoko proved to be political-protest literature against slavery, because the story, plot, and characters followed the narrative conventions of the European romance novel. In the event, the Irish playwright Thomas Southerne adapted the novel Oroonoko into the stage play Oroonoko: A Tragedy (1696) that stressed the pathos of the love story, the circumstances, and the characters, which consequently gave political importance to the play and the novel for the candid cultural representation of slave-powered European colonialism.

Uses of the stereotype

Romantic primitivism
In the 1st century AD, in the book Germania, Tacitus ascribed to the Germans the cultural superiority of the noble savage way of life, because Rome was too civilized, unlike the savage Germans. The art historian Erwin Panofsky explains that:

In the novel The Adventures of Telemachus, Son of Ulysses (1699), in the “Encounter with the Mandurians” (Chapter IX), the theologian François Fénelon presented the noble savage stock character in conversation with civilized men from Europe about possession and ownership of  Nature:

In the 18th century, British intellectual debate about Primitivism used the Highland Scots as a local, European example of a noble savage people, as often as the American Indians were the example. The English cultural perspective scorned the ostensibly rude manners of the Highlanders, whilst admiring and idealizing the toughness of person and character of the Highland Scots; the writer Tobias Smollett described the Highlanders:

Thomas Hobbes
The imperial politics of Western Europe featured debates about soft primitivism and hard primitivism worsened with the publication of Leviathan, or The Matter, Forme and Power of a Commonwealth Ecclesiasticall and Civil (1651), by Thomas Hobbes, which justified the central-government règime of absolute monarchy as politically necessary for societal stability and the national security of the state:

In the Kingdom of France, critics of Crown and Church risked censorship and summary imprisonment without trial, and primitivism was political protest against the repressive imperial règimes of Louis XIV and Louis XV. In his travelogue of North America, the writer Louis-Armand de Lom d'Arce de Lahontan, Baron de Lahontan, who had lived with the Huron Indians (Wyandot people), ascribed deist and egalitarian politics to Adari, a Canadian Indian who played the role of noble savage for French explorers:

Benjamin Franklin
Benjamin Franklin, who had good relations with American Indians during the French and Indian War (1754–1763), protested against the legal authorities’ indifference to the Paxton Boys massacre of Indian women and children at Conestoga, Pennsylvania, in December 1763. To temper and control the racial violence of the white population, Franklin organized a Quaker militia to strengthen the local government in policing the entire colonial community to prevent further attacks against the local Indian populace. In the pamphlet Remarks Concerning the Savages of North America (1784), Franklin especially noted the racism inherent to the colonists using the word savage as synonym for the North American natives:

Franklin used the white colonists’ massacres to describe and identify the vigilante Paxton Boys as “Christian white savages”, and called for the judicial punishment of men and women who carried the Bible in one hand and a hatchet in the other. Franklin also praised the way of life of the Indians, their customs of hospitality, their councils of government, and acknowledged that some white men had foregone civilization to live like an Indian, but that the opposite rarely occurred, because few Indians chose civilization over savagery.

Jean-Jacques Rousseau

Like the Earl of Shaftesbury in the Inquiry Concerning Virtue, or Merit (1699), Jean-Jacques Rousseau likewise believed that Man is innately good, and that urban civilization, characterized by jealousy, envy, and self-consciousness, has made men bad in character. In Discourse on the Origins of Inequality Among Men (1754), Rousseau said that in the primordial state of nature, man was a solitary creature who was not méchant (bad), but was possessed of an "innate repugnance to see others of his kind suffer."

Moreover, as the philosophe of the Jacobin radicals of the French Revolution (1789–1799), ideologues accused Rousseau of claiming that the noble savage was a real type of man, despite the term not appearing in work written by Rousseau; in addressing The Supposed Primitivism of Rousseau’s Discourse on Inequality (1923), the academic Arthur O. Lovejoy said that:

In the Discourse on the Origins of Inequality, Rousseau said that the rise of humanity began a "formidable struggle for existence" between the species man and the other animal species of Nature. That under the pressure of survival emerged le caractère spécifique de l'espèce humaine, the specific quality of character, which distinguishes man from beast, such as intelligence capable of "almost unlimited development", and the faculté de se perfectionner, the capability of perfecting himself.

Having invented tools, discovered fire, and transcended the state of nature, Rousseau said that "it is easy to see. . . . that all our labors are directed upon two objects only, namely, for oneself, the commodities of life, and consideration on the part of others"; thus amour propre (self regard) is a "factitious feeling arising, only in society, which leads a man to think more highly of himself than of any other." Therefore, "it is this desire for reputation, honors, and preferment which devours us all . . . this rage to be distinguished, that we own what is best and worst in men — our virtues and our vices, our sciences and our errors, our conquerors and our philosophers — in short, a vast number of evil things and a small number of good [things]"; that is the aspect of character "which inspires men to all the evils which they inflict upon one another."

Men become men only in a civil society based upon law, and only a reformed system of education can make men good; the academic Lovejoy explains that:

Rousseau proposes reorganizing society with a social contract that will "draw from the very evil from which we suffer the remedy which shall cure it"; Lovejoy notes that in the Discourse on the Origins of Inequality, Rousseau:

Charles Dickens
In 1853, in the weekly magazine Household Words, Charles Dickens published a negative review of the Indian Gallery cultural program, by the portraitist George Catlin, which then was touring England. About Catlin’s oil paintings of the North American natives, the critic Charles Baudelaire said that “He [Catlin] has brought back alive the proud and free characters of these chiefs; both their nobility and manliness.”

Despite European idealization of the noble savage as a type of morally superior man, in the essay “The Noble Savage” (1853), Dickens expressed repugnance for the American Indians and their way of life, because they were dirty and cruel and continually quarrelled among themselves. In the satire of romanticised primitivism Dickens showed that the painter Catlin, the Indian Gallery of portraits and landscapes, and the white people who admire the idealized American Indians or the bushmen of Africa are examples of the term noble savage used as a means of Othering a person into a racialist stereotype. Dickens begins by dismissing the noble savage as not being a distinct human being:

Dickens ends his cultural criticism by reiterating his argument against the romanticized persona of the noble savage:

Theories of racialism
In 1860, the physician John Crawfurd and the anthropologist James Hunt identified the racial stereotype of the noble savage as an example of scientific racism, yet, as advocates of polygenism — that each race is a distinct species of Man — Crawfurd and Hunt dismissed the arguments of their opponents by accusing them of being proponents of “Rousseau’s Noble Savage”. Later in his career, Crawfurd re-introduced the noble savage term to modern anthropology, and deliberately ascribed coinage of the term to Jean-Jacques Rousseau.

Modern perspectives

Opponents of primitivism 
In War Before Civilization: the Myth of the Peaceful Savage (1996), the archaeologist Lawrence H. Keeley said that the "widespread myth" that "civilized humans have fallen from grace from a simple, primeval happiness, a peaceful golden age" is contradicted and refuted by archeologic evidence that indicates that violence was common practice in early human societies. That the noble savage paradigm has warped anthropological literature to political ends. Moreover, the anthropologist Roger Sandall likewise accused anthropologists of exalting the noble savage above civilized man, by way of designer tribalism, a form of romanticised primitivism that dehumanises Indigenous peoples into the cultural stereotype of the indigène peoples who live a primitive way of life demarcated and limited by tradition, which discouraged Indigenous peoples from cultural assimilation into the dominant Western culture.

Supporters of primitivism 
In “The Prehistory of Warfare: Misled by Ethnography” (2006), the researchers Jonathan Haas and Matthew Piscitelli challenged the idea that the human species is innately bellicose, and that warfare is an occasional activity by a society, but is not an inherent part of human culture. Moreover, the UNESCO’s Seville Statement on Violence (1986) specifically rejects claims that the human propensity towards violence has a genetic basis.

Anarcho-primitivists, such as the philosopher John Zerzan, rely upon a strong ethical dualism between Anarcho-primitivism and civilization; hence, "life before domestication [and] agriculture was, in fact, largely one of leisure, intimacy with nature, sensual wisdom, sexual equality, and health." Zerzan's claims about the moral superiority of primitive societies are based on a certain reading of the works of anthropologists, such as Marshall Sahlins and Richard Borshay Lee, wherein the anthropologic category of primitive society is restricted to hunter-gatherer societies who have no domesticated animals or agriculture, e.g. the stable social hierarchy of the American Indians of the north-west North America, who live from fishing and foraging, is attributed to having domesticated dogs and the cultivation of tobacco, that animal husbandry and agriculture equal civilization.

See also

 Racism in the work of Charles Dickens
 Essays (Montaigne)
 Exoticism
 Native Americans in German popular culture
 Native American hobbyism in Germany
 Neotribalism
 Objectification
 Orientalism

 Pelagianism
 Positive stereotype
 Stereotypes about indigenous peoples of North America
 Racial fetishism
 Romantic racism
 Virtuous pagan
 Feral child
 Wild man
 Human zoo
 Uncontacted peoples
 Isolationism

Concepts:
 Cultural relativism
 Golden Age
 Master-slave dialectic
 Social progress
 State of nature
 Xenocentrism

Cultural examples:
 The Blue Lagoon (novel)
 Brave New World
 A High Wind in Jamaica (novel)
 Legend of the Rainbow Warriors
 Lord of the Flies
 Magical Negro
 Plastic shaman

References
Informational notes

Citations

Further reading

 Barnett, Louise. Touched by Fire: the Life, Death, and Mythic Afterlife of George Armstrong Custer. University of Nebraska Press [1986], 2006.
 Barzun, Jacques (2000). From Dawn to Decadence: 500 Years of Western Cultural Life, 1500 to the Present. New York: HarperCollins. pp. 282–294, and passim.
 Bataille, Gretchen, M. and Silet Charles L., editors. Introduction by Vine Deloria, Jr. The Pretend Indian: Images of Native Americans in the Movies. Iowa State University Press, 1980*Berkhofer, Robert F. "The White Man's Indian: Images of the American Indian from Columbus to the Present"
 Boas, George ([1933] 1966).  The Happy Beast in French Thought in the Seventeenth Century. Baltimore: Johns Hopkins Press. Reprinted by Octagon Press in 1966.
 Boas, George ([1948] 1997). Primitivism and Related Ideas in the Middle Ages. Baltimore: Johns Hopkins Press.
 Bordewich, Fergus M.  "Killing the White Man's Indian: Reinventing Native Americans at the End of the Twentieth Century"
 Bury, J.B. (1920).  The Idea of Progress: an Inquiry into its Origins and Growth. (Reprint) New York: Cosimo Press, 2008.
 Edgerton, Robert (1992). Sick Societies: Challenging the Myth of Primitive Harmony. New York: Free Press. 
 Edwards, Brendan Frederick R. (2008)  "'He Scarcely Resembles the Real Man': images of the Indian in popular culture". Website:  Our Legacy. Material relating to First Nations, Metis, and Inuit, found in Saskatchewan cultural and heritage collections.
 Ellingson, Ter. (2001). The Myth of the Noble Savage (Berkeley, CA.: University of California Press).
 Fabian, Johannes. Time and the Other: How Anthropology Makes its Object
 Fairchild, Hoxie Neale (1928). The Noble Savage: A Study in Romantic Naturalism (New York)
 Fitzgerald, Margaret Mary ([1947] 1976). First Follow Nature: Primitivism in English Poetry 1725–1750. New York: Kings Crown Press. Reprinted New York: Octagon Press.
 
 Hazard, Paul ([1937] 1947). The European Mind (1690–1715). Cleveland, Ohio: Meridian Books.
 Keeley, Lawrence H. (1996)  War Before Civilization: The Myth of the Peaceful Savage. Oxford: University Press.
 Krech, Shepard (2000). The Ecological Indian: Myth and History. New York: Norton. 
 LeBlanc, Steven (2003). Constant battles: the myth of the peaceful, noble savage. New York : St Martin's Press 
 Lovejoy, Arthur O. (1923, 1943). "The Supposed Primitivism of Rousseau's Discourse on Inequality, " Modern Philology Vol. 21, No. 2 (Nov., 1923):165–186. Reprinted in Essays in the History of Ideas. Baltimore: Johns Hopkins Press, 1948 and 1960.
 Lovejoy, A. O. and Boas, George ([1935] 1965). Primitivism and Related Ideas in Antiquity. Baltimore: Johns Hopkins Press. Reprinted by Octagon Books, 1965. 
 Lovejoy, Arthur O. and George Boas. (1935). A Documentary History of Primitivism and Related Ideas, vol. 1. Baltimore.
 Moore, Grace (2004). Dickens And Empire: Discourses Of Class, Race And Colonialism In The Works Of Charles Dickens (Nineteenth Century Series). Ashgate.
 Olupọna, Jacob Obafẹmi Kẹhinde, Editor. (2003) Beyond primitivism: indigenous religious traditions and modernity. New York and London: Routledge. , 
 Pagden, Anthony (1982). The Fall of the Natural Man: The American Indian and the origins of comparative ethnology. Cambridge: Cambridge University Press.
 Pinker, Steven (2002). The Blank Slate: The Modern Denial of Human Nature. Viking 
 Sandall, Roger (2001). The Culture Cult: Designer Tribalism and Other Essays 
 Reinhardt, Leslie Kaye.  "British and Indian Identities in a Picture by Benjamin West". Eighteenth-Century Studies 31: 3 (Spring 1998): 283–305
 Rollins, Peter C. and John E. O'Connor, editors (1998). Hollywood's Indian : the Portrayal of the Native American in Film. Lexington, Kentucky: University of Kentucky Press.
 Tinker, Chaunchy Brewster (1922). Nature's Simple Plan: a phase of radical thought in the mid-eighteenth century. New Jersey: Princeton University Press.
 Torgovnick, Marianna (1991). Gone Primitive: Savage Intellects, Modern Lives (Chicago)
 Whitney, Lois Payne (1934). Primitivism and the Idea of Progress in English Popular Literature of the Eighteenth Century. Baltimore: Johns Hopkins Press
 Wolf, Eric R.(1982). Europe and the People without History. Berkeley: University of California Press.

External links
 Massacres during the Wars of Religion: The St. Bartholomew's Day massacre: a foundational event
 Louis Menand. "What Comes Naturally". A review of Steven Pinker's The Blank Slate from The New Yorker
 Peter Gay. "Breeding is Fundamental". Book Forum. April / May 2009

Stock characters
Multiculturalism
Anthropology
Cultural concepts
Anti-indigenous racism
Ethnic and racial stereotypes
Western (genre) staples and terminology